Jinjiang Action Park is a large amusement park at No. 201 Hongmei Road in Xuhui District, Shanghai. Founded in 1984, it is affiliated to the Jinjiang Group.

Rides and attractions

Roller coasters

Other attractions

Shanghai Ferris Wheel

Its 63-passenger cars can each carry 6 passengers who, on a clear day, can see the giant Oriental Pearl TV Tower in Pudong, the Songpu, Fengpu and Xupu bridges on the Huangpu River in the south, and Sheshan Hill in the west.

Construction started in November 2002 and it began operating in May 2003, having cost over 10 million yuan (US$1.2 million) to build.

Transportation

The park can be reached by taking Shanghai Metro Line 1 to Jinjiang Park station.

Also, Hukun Expressway reach the park directly. As well, more than 20 bus routes have stops set up there.

References

External links

Amusement parks in Shanghai
Tourist attractions in Shanghai
Buildings and structures in Shanghai
1984 establishments in China
Amusement parks opened in 1984